Sergey may refer to:

 Sergey (name), a Russian given name (including a list of people with the name)
 Sergey, Switzerland, a municipality in Switzerland
 Sergey (wasp), a genus in subfamily Doryctinae